Toast is an optical disc authoring and media conversion software application for macOS and classic Mac OS. Its name is a play on the word burn, a term used for the writing of information onto a disc through the use of a laser.

Discs can be burned directly through Mac OS X, but Toast provides added control over the process as well as extra features, including file recovery for damaged discs, cataloging and tracking of files burned to disc. It also provides support for audio and video formats that QuickTime does not support, such as FLAC and Ogg.

History 
Toast was conceived of by Greg Kerr in 1993, then CEO of Astarte, who outsourced development to Markus Fest. In 1997, the product and team was purchased by Adaptec, and later transferred to Roxio (then a division of Adaptec).

Version 4 is the last release that can run on System 7 with a 68k CPU. Version 5 introduced support for Video CD and DVD authoring, which was improved in version 6 by addition of MPEG-2 encoding. Version 6 supported more external DVD burners than Apple's iDVD.

Toast 6 Titanium included another Roxio app, CD Spin Doctor 2, which can clean noise from an audio track.

Features 
Main features of the Toast 6 are: video and photo DVDs can have menus and buttons; package includes ToastAnywhere, that uses Apple's Bonjour protocol to support burning discs from other Macs on the local network; compression and 128-bit encryption of files and folders before burning; support for all audio and video codecs supported by QuickTime; improved interface; creation of slide shows with panning, zooming, transitions, and a soundtrack using the "Motion Pictures" feature.

Reception 
In a 2003 review of Toast 6, Macworld described Toast as "venerable" and the "reigning champ" of Mac disc-burning software.

References

External links
 Roxio's homepage
 Version History from Roxio
 Adaptec Toast 3.8 announcement
 Version history for 6.x version
 Version history for 7.x version
 Version history for 9.x version

MacOS CD ripping software
Optical disc authoring software
Roxio software